Taq-e Gara or some times Taq-e Shirin is a stone structure in Iran which belongs to the Sasanian Empire. It is built in the Patagh Pass in the heights known as the Gate of Zagros in Kermanshah Province of Iran. This structure is located on the way from Kermanshah to Sarpol-e Zahab, on the 15th kilometer from Sarpol-e Zahab; beside an ancient paving which connects the Iranian Plateau to Mesopotamia. Due to changes of the path, now it is located below the road slope.

Design and construction
There are conflicting views as to the time of its construction. Parthian and Sassanid eras have been proposed, but most archeologists and historians believe that it has been built during late Sassanid Empire for a variety of reasons.

Access and attributes

The monument is located on the old road from Kermanshah to Qasr-e Shirin with the new road overlooking it. It is about a five hundred meters walk away from the main road.

See also
Taq-e Bostan
Taq-e Shirin and Farhad

References

External links

 http://www.gardeshyaran.com/?cu=134&se=1&ki=680&id=249&inf=en
 http://thinduke.free.fr/cpg/thumbnails.php?album=85

Sasanian architecture
Archaeological sites in Iran
Buildings and structures in Kermanshah Province